Kew is a place in the London Borough of Richmond upon Thames, UK.

Kew may also refer to:

Places

Geography
 Kew, Gauteng, a suburb of Johannesburg, South Africa
 Kew, Merseyside, a suburb of Southport, England
 Kew, Michigan, an unincorporated community in the United States
 Kew, New South Wales, Australia
 Kew, Otago, a suburb of Dunedin, New Zealand
 Kew, Invercargill, a suburb of Invercargill, New Zealand
 Kew, Turks and Caicos Islands 
 Kew, Victoria, a suburb of Melbourne, Australia
 Kew East, Melbourne, a suburb east of Kew 
 St. Kew, a village in Cornwall, England

Electoral districts
Kew (Richmond upon Thames ward), a local electoral district in London, England, List of electoral wards in Greater London
Kew (Sefton ward), a local electoral district in Southport, England
 Electoral district of Kew, an electoral district in Victoria, Australia

People
 Kew (personal name), notable people with this surname or given name
 Kew, a Hakka variation of the Chinese Qiū (surname)

Other uses
 Kew. Rhone., an album by John Greaves and Peter Blegvad
 KEW, the IATA code for Keewaywin Airport
 Kew Magazine published by the Royal Botanic Gardens, Kew 
 Kinetic energy weapon (KEW)

See also
 Kew Gardens (disambiguation)
 Kew Bridge, a bridge across the River Thames in Greater London
 Kew Bridge railway station, on the north side of the bridge
 Kew Bridge Steam Museum
 Kew Bridge Ecovillage
 Kew Bridge Studios